In number theory, a Wilson prime is a prime number  such that  divides , where "" denotes the factorial function; compare this with Wilson's theorem, which states that every prime  divides . Both are named for 18th-century English mathematician John Wilson; in 1770, Edward Waring credited the theorem to Wilson, although it had been stated centuries earlier by Ibn al-Haytham.

The only known Wilson primes are 5, 13, and 563 . Early work on these numbers included searches by N. G. W. H. Beeger and Emma Lehmer, but 563 was not discovered until the early 1950s, when computer searches could be applied to the problem. If any others exist, they must be greater than 2 × 1013.

Several computer searches have been done in the hope of finding new Wilson primes.
The Ibercivis distributed computing project includes a search for Wilson primes. Another search was coordinated at the Great Internet Mersenne Prime Search forum.

Generalizations

Wilson primes of order  
Generalized Wilson primes of order  are the primes  such that  divides .

It was conjectured that for every natural number , there are infinitely many Wilson primes of order .

The smallest generalized Wilson primes of order  are:

Near-Wilson primes

A prime  satisfying the congruence  with small  can be called a near-Wilson prime.

Wilson numbers
A Wilson number is a natural number  such that , where and where the  term is positive if and only if  has a primitive root and negative otherwise. The Wilson numbers are

If a Wilson number  is prime, then  is a Wilson prime. There are 13 Wilson numbers up to 5.

See also 
 PrimeGrid
 Table of congruences
 Wall–Sun–Sun prime
 Wieferich prime
 Wolstenholme prime

References

Further reading

External links 
 The Prime Glossary: Wilson prime
 
 Status of the search for Wilson primes

Classes of prime numbers
Factorial and binomial topics
Unsolved problems in number theory